József Sándor (born 22 October 1961) is a politician in Serbia from the country's Hungarian national minority community. He served in the Assembly of Vojvodina from 2004 to 2012 and in the National Assembly of Serbia from 2012 to 2013 as a member of G17 Plus and the successor United Regions of Serbia (Ujedinjeni regioni Srbije, URS). He is now a member of the Municipal Assembly of Senta, where he is the leader of an independent group.

Early life and private career
Sándor was born in Senta, Autonomous Province of Vojvodina, in what was then the People's Republic of Serbia in the Federal People's Republic of Yugoslavia. He trained as a manager and has been the director of the agricultural cooperative Napredak in the village of Gornji Breg.

Politician

Assembly of Vojvodina (2004–12)
Sándor was first elected to the Vojvodina assembly in the 2004 provincial election, for the division of Senta. He was one of only two G17 Plus candidates elected in this cycle. He later appeared in the 248th position (out of 250) on the party's electoral list in the 2007 Serbian parliamentary election. The party won nineteen seats, and he was not awarded a mandate. (From 2000 to 2011, Serbian parliamentary mandates were awarded to sponsoring parties or coalitions rather than to individual candidates, and it was common practice for the mandates to be distributed out of numerical order. Sándor could have been assigned a mandate despite his low position on the list, which was in any event mostly alphabetical, although he was not.)

Sándor was a substitute member of Serbia's delegation to the Chamber of Regions in the Council of Europe's Congress of Local and Regional Authorities during his first term in the Vojvodina assembly.

G17 Plus contested the 2008 Vojvodina provincial election in an alliance with the Democratic Party (Demokratska stranka, DS), called For a European Serbia, and Sándor was re-elected for Senta under the alliance's banner. For a European Serbia won an outright majority in the assembly, and Sándor served as a supporter of the provincial administration. He also received the first position on G17 Plus's list for Senta in the concurrent 2008 local elections, although he did not take a mandate in the municipal assembly afterwards.

In 2010, G17 Plus formed the URS as an umbrella alliance with smaller regionalist parties across Serbia. The following year, Serbia's electoral laws were reformed such that mandates in elections held under proportional representation were awarded to candidates on successful lists in numerical order.

Sándor sought re-election as the URS's candidate in Senta in the 2012 provincial election and was defeated. He was also given the twenty-second position on the alliance's list in the concurrent 2012 Serbian parliamentary election and was not initially elected when the list won only sixteen seats. He led the URS's list for the Senta municipal assembly in the 2012 local elections and this time was elected when the list won three seats. He briefly served as deputy president of the assembly, although he stood down from this role after accepting a mandate in the national assembly.

Parliamentarian and after (2012–present)
The Serbian Progressive Party (Srpska napredna stranka, SNS) and the Socialist Party of Serbia (Socijalistička partija Srbije, SPS) formed a coalition government after the 2012 parliamentary election, and the URS was initially included as a junior partner in the administration. Sándor was awarded a parliamentary mandate on 29 August 2012 as a replacement for Vidoje Petrović, who resigned because he could not hold a dual mandate as a parliamentarian and mayor of Loznica. For the next year, he served as a supporter of the administration. In March 2013, he was part of Serbia's delegation to a conference in Sarajevo of countries participating in the Stabilisation and Association Process.

The URS became a unified political party on 20 April 2013, and G17 Plus formally merged into the new entity. Shortly thereafter, on 31 July 2013, the URS was removed from Serbia's coalition government and became part of the opposition. Sándor was one of three party delegates who subsequently resigned from the assembly on 2 September 2013 to allow the former URS ministers in Serbia's government to reclaim their parliamentary seats. He appeared in the forty-seventh position on the URS's list in the 2014 Serbian parliamentary election. The party failed to cross the electoral threshold to win representation in the assembly and dissolved in 2015.

Sándor affiliated with Hungarian Movement after leaving parliament and appeared in the fourth position on the party's list in Senta in the 2016 local elections. He was re-elected to the municipal assembly when the list won five mandates. He later led the independent Citizens' Movement for Senta list in the 2020 local elections and was again re-elected when the list won three mandates.

Electoral record

Provincial (Vojvodina)

References

1961 births
Living people
People from Senta
Hungarians in Vojvodina
Members of the Assembly of Vojvodina
Members of the National Assembly (Serbia)
Substitute Members of the Chamber of Regions in the Congress of Local and Regional Authorities of the Council of Europe
G17 Plus politicians
United Regions of Serbia politicians